Paradrymonia lineata is a species of plant in the family Gesneriaceae.

Synonyms
 Centrosolenia lineata C.V.Morton
 Episcia lineata (C.V.Morton) Leeuwenb.
 Episcia lurida C.V.Morton & Raymond
 Paradrymonia lurida (C.V. Morton & Raymond) Wiehler

References

 University of Alabama Gesneriaceae Image Gallery

lineata